Forging the Sword is a fantasy novel written by American author Hilari Bell. It is the third and final book in the Farsala trilogy. It follows the adventures of Jiaan, Kavi, and Soraya as the try to regain control of their country from the invading Hrum empire.

Plot summary
Soraya, Kavi and Jiaan have agreed to work together to defeat the Hrum and free Farsala. However, distrust of Kavi is impeding this effort. The three attempt to work together, but it becomes difficult. Luckily, they have finally uncovered the secret of watersteel, with the help of Kavi's ability to "speak" to metal.

Only a few months remain in the Hrums self-imposed limit to conquer Farsala. The three youths learn that Garren, the Strategus in charge of the conquest, has more riding on the conquest than just Farsala. His father, a member of the Senate of the Hrum Empire, stated that Garren would conquer Farsala with only ten thousand troops. In addition, his father stated that he will resign from the Senate if this is not accomplished. He did these things in order to secure the assignment of the Farsalan conquest to his son. Garren's father's enemies are eager for this to happen. When Garren requisitions gold to hire Kadeshi aid and circumvent the troop sanction, the Senate sends a delegation to review the conquest.

Kavi, Jiaan and Soraya decide to capture the gold before it reaches the Kadeshi, as a Kadeshi warlord has informed Jiaan that if he chooses to pay, the warlord will order the troops he sent Garren to betray the Hrum, crippling the army. Jiaan, Kavi and Soraya do not wish for this to happen. Soraya, with Kavi accompanying her, visits the bandits and convinces them to rob the Senate committee, which will arrive at the nearby harbor of Dugaz. They believe that if the delegation is robbed during its stay, it will demonstrate to the Senate that Garren does not have the country under control.  However, upon arriving at the bandits' lair, Shir, their leader, informs Kavi and Soraya that the Senate arrived a week ago, and the bandits failed to rob them.  Disappointed, the two promise Shir that in exchange for letting them go, they will get the Suud to try to develop a cure for the swamp fever plaguing the bandits.

The gold arrives in Setesafon, and under Garren's close supervision. Using stolen Hrum disguises, Kavi infiltrates the palace, attempting to uncover the passwords into the vault, but is captured. Before he is captured he burns the words into his mule's saddle, which Jiaan and Soraya find. Jiaan and Soraya enter the palace under a guise that Jiaan has captured Soraya. They release the gold into barrels in the river.

After the gold is discovered missing Garren orders Kavi tortured, but Kavi withstands it. Garren publicly declares that if Sorahb does not fight Garren as a champion of Farsala, Kavi will be slain. While Jiaan believes the challenge to be a trap and does not think Kavi will be killed, Fasal accepts the challenge. After Fasal breaks Garren's blade with the newly developed Farsalan watersteel, Garren orders Fasal killed.  The Farsalans begin rioting and Soraya, outraged, uses magic to kill Garren with lightning.

The senate committee is convinced Farsala is not subdued, and decides the Hrum shall leave Farsala as an allied state. The remaining people send delegates, and Kavi, much to his annoyance, is elected to be a "councilherd" of the council; to make things run smoothly. Jiaan is invited to accompany the Hrum on their next campaign, that in Kadesh; he accepts. Soraya decides to live with the Suud.

Characters

Main characters
Jiaan- Is a nineteen-year-old peasant born deghan who has brown hair and brown eyes. He is the commander of the small but determined Farsalan army. He is very brave, courageous, and extremely loyal to his country.
Kavi- Is a twenty-year-old peddler who was raised in Mazad working in a blacksmith. He loathes the deghans, is very quick-witted and is now loyal to Farsala.
Soraya-  Is a sixteen-year-old deghass with long black hair and brown eyes. She is loyal to her family and friends and will do anything to help them. In the final book, she decides to join the Suud.

American fantasy novels
2006 American novels